Lily Tembo (November 20, 1981 – September 14, 2009), professionally known as Lily T, was a Zambian musician, radio presenter, journalist and charity worker who had won national acclaim with her 2004 debut album Lily T. For this album, she received two awards.

Tembo had released two albums and was working on a third at the time of her death. Aside from singing, she was known for presenting on the 5th FM Radio in Zambia, working as a journalist and involved in charity work.

Background
Tembo was born in Kabwe, Zambia, and was raised in a music-loving family. She was inspired by her father, who played African bongo, and her sisters and mother, who sung in church. 
Tembo attended secondary school at the Kabulonga Girls High School in Zambia's capital City, Lusaka. Later on, she pursued a career in journalism at Evelyn Hone College.

Tembo emerged onto the music market in 2004 with the album Lily T, which started her career and brought her national attention. She released her second album in 2006. Tembo was also a news reader for 5th FM radio, a radio station based in Lusaka, Zambia.

After winning one award, she was recognized by BBC Africa as a promising African celebrity who remained original to traditional instruments.

Charity work
Lily had been involved in raising malaria awareness in Zambia. In April 2009, she led worshippers at a world malaria day commemoration in Lusaka.

Death
After complaining over "minor stomach pains" and suffering severe gastritis, Tembo died September 14 at the age of 27.

Tembo's sister Patience told the press "She had gastritis, she fell sick on Saturday, started vomiting a lot and developed anaemia. On Monday around 19:00 hours, she died."

Discography
 Lily T (2004)
 Osalila (2006)

Awards and nominations

References

1981 births
2009 deaths
21st-century Zambian women singers
Zambian journalists
Zambian women journalists
Deaths from gastritis
21st-century Zambian women writers
People from Kabwe District
20th-century journalists